Greenfield Park is a suburb of Sydney, in the state of New South Wales, Australia. Greenfield Park is located 36 kilometres west of the Sydney central business district in the local government area of the City of Fairfield. The suburb has one of the most highest proportion of Assyrian people in the Sydney area and Australia per se.

History
Aboriginal people from the Cabrogal tribe, a sub-group of the Gandangara tribe, have lived in the Fairfield area for over 30,000 years. White settlement began in the Fairfield area in the early 19th century. Greenfield Park was named after a major road that cuts through the Council Ward of St Johns. It officially became a suburb on 3 August 1979.

Churches
Greenfield Park is home to St Hurmizd Cathedral, Australia's largest Assyrian church.

Commercial area
Greenfield Park is home to a small local shopping village, known as the "Greenfield Park Shopping Village". The Shopping Village houses a number of SME (Small to Medium Enterprises), as well as an IGA.

Schools
Greenfield Park is home to St. Johns Park High School, and St Hurmizd Assyrian Primary School.

Population
At the 2021 census, there were 5,394 residents in Greenfield Park. 35.6% of people were born in Australia. The most common other countries of birth were Iraq (23.4%), Vietnam (9.8%), Syria (3.8%), Cambodia (7.5%) and the Philippines (2.8%).

The top ancestries were Assyrian (26.4%), Vietnamese (12.3%), Chinese (9.0%), Chaldean (8.2%) and Iraqi (7.8%).

The majority of people spoke a language other than English at home. Other languages spoken included Assyrian Neo-Aramaic (24.6%), Vietnamese (13.3%), Chaldean Neo-Aramaic (8.7%), Arabic (7.2%) and Spanish (2.9%). 

The top religious affiliations were Catholicism 37.2%, Assyrian Church of the East (17.6%), Buddhism (13.5%), No religion (9.5%) and Christian, nfd (no further definition) (5.5%). Christianity was the largest religious group reported overall (72.3%).

Transport
The T-way bus route opened in 2003 and passes through Greenfield Park. Also, a number of Transit Systems Sydney buses pass through Greenfield Park or nearby suburbs. Notably, route 804 links residents of Greenfield Park to both the Liverpool and Parramatta commercial areas.

References

Suburbs of Sydney
City of Fairfield